Alexandrian may refer to:
 People, objects or culture of Alexandria, Egypt
 A regional stage in the Silurian geological period

See also
Alexandrine (disambiguation)
Alexandrian Wicca
Alexandria (disambiguation)